Shlomit Baytelman Albala (Hebrew: שלומית בייטלמן; Yiddish: שלאָמיט בייַטעלמאַן; born Afula, November 30, 1949) is a Israeli-born actress, director, and writer who became a naturalized Chilean citizen. She gained recognition in the mid-1970s as a sex symbol in Chilean cinema, particularly for her role in the film Julio comienza en julio, and later for an extensive career in television.

Biography 
Baytelman was born in Israel in 1949 and immigrated to Chile in 1951, where she built her entire career. She is the daughter of Bernardo Baytelman and Eliana Albala. In 1966, she was recognized as the best school actress in Santiago. Baytelman graduated from the Theater School of the University of Chile in 1971 and made her debut in La Remienda and Tres Tristes Tigres, both by Alejandro Sieveking. In 1972 and 1973, she participated in the productions Chiloé cielos cubiertos, by María Asunción Requena, and Las troyanas by Euripides. Although best known for her extensive theatrical career, Baytelman gained recognition for her role as a prostitute in the film Julio comienza en julio, directed by Silvio Caiozzi.

On television, she stood out in telenovelas such as La gran mentira (1982), El juego de la vida, and Las hederas (both in 1983), El milagro de vivir (1990), and Rompecorazón (1994). However, her most significant success came from her role as Carla in the popular TVN sitcom Los Venegas, where she remained for two decades. In 2019, Baytelman was seriously injured in a hit-and-run accident with a cyclist. After a lengthy rehabilitation, she returned to acting in 2020.

Filmography

Films

Telenovelas

Series and unitaries

References 

1949 births
Living people

Chilean television actors
Chilean film actors
20th-century Chilean actors
21st-century Chilean actors